Senador Guiomard ( or ) is a municipality located in the northeast of the Brazilian state of Acre. Its population is 23,236 and its area is 2,047 km².

References

Municipalities in Acre (state)